The West Papua National Liberation Army (abbreviated TPNPB), commonly known in Indonesia as Armed Criminal Group (abbreviated as KKB), is a Western New Guinean insurgent group in Indonesia. It is the armed wing of the Free Papua Organization.

It has been labelled as a terrorist organization by Indonesian Coordinating Ministry for Political, Legal, and Security Affairs.

Military strategy
The TPNPB employs guerilla tactics to target and destroy industrial buildings as a rejection of Indonesian-led development. In said attacks, and other attacks, they use machetes, bows and arrows, axes, and limited numbers of revolvers and rifles.

OPM Conference
The Free Papua Organization held a conference in December 2012 and decided that Goliath Tabuni was to be the head of the TPNPB, while Gabriel Melkizedek Awom was to be the Lt. Gen. and Terianus Satto was set as the Chief of Staff.

Incidents 
 2023 Oksibil attacks
 Nduga massacre
 Nogolait shooting

See also 
 West Papua Revolutionary Army

References

Rebel groups in Indonesia
Papua conflict